Ede is a dialect continuum of Benin and Togo that is closely related to the Yoruba language. The best-known variety is Ife.

Kluge (2011) includes Yoruba within Ede.

The Ede dialects include Ede Cabe (Caabe, Shabè), Ede Ica (Itcha, Isha), Ede Idaca (Idaaca, Idaatcha), Ede Ije, Ede Nago (Nagot), Ede Kura Nago, Ede Manigri (Kambolé), and Ede Ife.

References

Yoruboid languages
Languages of Togo
Languages of Benin